Hikari is the 14th single by Japanese singer Mai Hoshimura. It was released on August 20, 2008 under the Sony Music Entertainment label. The title track was used as the theme song for the TBS TV drama . The single peaked at number 14 in the Oricon Singles Chart selling 7,883 units on its first week. This is currently Mai Hoshimura's most successful single after her singles "Get Happy", "Sakura Biyori", and her previous single "Regret" which are her first three top 30 entries on the Oricon charts since she started her singing career.

This single's catalog number is SECL-672.

Track listing 
"ひかり / Hikari" - 5:22
Composition/Lyrics: Mai Hoshimura, Shiraishi Satori
Arrangement: Akira Senju
"Hello" - 4:44
Composition/Lyrics: Mai Hoshimura
Arrangement: Suzuki Daichi Hideyuki
"ひかり (Instrumental) / Hikari (Instrumental)" - 5:20

Charts and sales

References

2008 singles
Mai Hoshimura songs
Japanese television drama theme songs
2008 songs
SME Records singles